Net 25 News Update (formerly Eagle News Update) is a Philippine television news broadcasting show broadcast by Net 25. It aired from October 24, 2011 to present, replacing I-Balita Update.

Philippine television news shows
2011 Philippine television series debuts
2010s Philippine television series
2020s Philippine television series
Filipino-language television shows
Net 25 original programming